Gergő Oláh (born 26 November 1988, Salgótarján) is a Hungarian singer and countertenor of Romani descent, most notable for winning the third season of X-Faktor and for participating in A Dal.

Personal life & music career
Before participating in X-Faktor, he worked in the public sector. He came first in the third season. He is also Gigi Radics's cousin.

A Dal
In late 2014, Oláh was selected to participate in A Dal 2015, the Hungarian national selection for the Eurovision Song Contest 2015 with the song A tükör előtt. The song reached the semi-final before being eliminated.

In December 2015, he was announced as one of the participants of A Dal 2016. He tried again to represent Hungary in the Eurovision Song Contest, this time with Győz a jó. He made it to the final and then the superfinal, but was not chosen; that honour going to Freddie.

Oláh also competed in A Dal 2017 as part of the band Roma Soul with the song Nyitva a ház. They were eliminated in the semi-finals.

Oláh is competed in A Dal 2019 with the song Hozzád bújnék. He was initially eliminated in the semi-finals, but after Petruska was disqualified following allegations of plagiarism, Oláh, being the eliminated semi-final entrant with the highest points, was brought in to replace Petruska. He was eliminated in the finals.

Discography

References

1988 births
Living people

People from Salgótarján
21st-century Hungarian male singers
Hungarian Romani people